The 2012 Indiana State Sycamores football team represented Indiana State University as a member of the Missouri Valley Football Conference (MVFC) during the 2012 NCAA Division I FCS football season. Led by Trent Miles in his fifth and final season as head coach, the Sycamores compiled an overall record of 7–4 with a mark of 5–3 in conference play, placing in a three-way tie for third in the MVFC. Indiana State played home games at Memorial Stadium in Terre Haute, Indiana.

Miles resigned at the end of the season to take the head coaching job at Georgia State. He was replaced by former UNLV head coach Mike Sanford.

Schedule

Ranking movements

References

Indiana State
Indiana State Sycamores football seasons
Indiana State Sycamores football